Good Enough may refer to:

Songs 
 "Good Enough" (Dodgy song), 1996
 "Good Enough" (Evanescence song), 2006
 "Good Enough" (The Ready Set song), 2016
 "Good Enough", by 8stops7 from In Moderation
 "Good Enough", by Bobby Brown from Bobby
 "Good Enough", by Brian McKnight from U-Turn
 "Good Enough", by Cover Your Tracks
 "Good Enough", by Darren Hayes from Spin
 "Good Enough", by Hoobastank from Every Man for Himself
 "Good Enough", by I Wayne from Book of Life
 "Good Enough", by Izzy Stradlin from 117°
 "Good Enough", by Jay Sean from My Own Way
 "Good Enough", by Lifehouse from the film soundtrack The Wild
 "Good Enough", by Little Mix from Salute
 "Good Enough", by Maisie Peters
 "Good Enough", by Maxeen from Maxeen
 "Good Enough", by Melanie Laine from Time Flies
 "Good Enough", by Mock Orange from Mock Orange
 "Good Enough", by Mudhoney from Every Good Boy Deserves Fudge
 "Good Enough", by Samiam from You Are Freaking Me Out
 "Good Enough", by Sarah McLachlan from Fumbling Towards Ecstasy
 "Good Enough", by Tom Petty from Mojo
 "Good Enough", by Van Halen from Fifty-One-Fifty
 "Good Enough", by Westbound Train from Transitions

Other uses
 Good Enough (album), by Ola, 2007
 Good Enough, a 2016 film featuring James Caan

See also
 Principle of good enough, a software design philosophy
 "The Goonies 'R' Good Enough", also known as "Good Enough", a song by Cyndi Lauper from the soundtrack to The Goonies
 "Good Enough Is Good Enough", a song by Sonata Arctica from Unia
 Goodenough (disambiguation)
 Godunov